Terebra amanda, common name Amanda's auger, is a species of sea snail, a marine gastropod mollusc in the family Terebridae, the auger snails.

Description
The length of the shell varies between 25 mm and 95 mm.

(Original description) The shell is rather bluntly, elongately subulate. It is pale brownish orange throughout. It contains 17 whorls, sculptured with a coarse infrasutural spiral crenate rib and five smaller spiral crenate ribs The interstices are finely punctate. The aperture is small. The columella recurved and twisted. The siphonal canal is short.

Distribution
This marine species occurs in the Red Sea, in the Indo-Pacific and off New Guinea, the Philippines and the Solomons.

References

 Vine, P. (1986). Red Sea Invertebrates. Immel Publishing, London. 224 pp
 Bratcher T. & Cernohorsky W.O. (1987). Living terebras of the world. A monograph of the recent Terebridae of the world. American Malacologists, Melbourne, Florida & Burlington, Massachusetts. 240pp. 
 Terryn Y. (2007). Terebridae: A Collectors Guide. Conchbooks & NaturalArt. 59pp + plates.
 Severns M. (2011) Shells of the Hawaiian Islands - The Sea Shells. Conchbooks, Hackenheim. 564 pp.

External links
 Gastropods.com: Terebra (Amanda-group) amanda

Terebridae
Gastropods described in 1844